Luxio may refer to:

Luxio (Pokémon), a Pokémon species
Daihatsu Luxio, a minivan model designed by Daihatsu released in 2009